Paracobitis hagiangensis is a species of stone loach found in Vietnam.

References

hagiangensis
Fish of Asia
Fish of Vietnam
Taxa named by Nguyễn Văn Hảo
Fish described in 2005